Tak Aghaj (also Romanized as Tak Āghāj; also known as Tak Āqāch) is a village in Ajorluy-ye Gharbi Rural District of Nokhtalu District of Baruq County, West Azerbaijan province, Iran. At the 2006 National Census, its population was 386 in 89 households, when it was in the former Baruq District of Miandoab County. The following census in 2011 counted 362 people in 92 households. The latest census in 2016 showed a population of 313 people in 86 households; it was the largest village in its rural district. After the census, Baruq District was separated from Miandoab County, elevated to the status of a county, and divided into two districts: the Central and Nokhtalu Districts.

References 

Populated places in West Azerbaijan Province